Professor Janaka Ruwanpura is the  Vice Provost and Associate Vice-President Research (International) of the University of Calgary, Canada (equivalent to Pro-Vice Chancellor in English system) effective Sept. 1, 2020. He has been the Vice-Provost International since 2013. In 2022, Janaka was a winner of the Top25 Canadian Immigrant Awards selected by Canadian Immigrant Magazine.

Early life and education
Janaka Yasantha Ruwanpura, a Buddhist, was born and raised in Colombo, Sri Lanka and was the only son of Dr. R.P. Sirisena, Medical Superintendent of Ayurvedic General Hospital (Colombo 8) and Nanda Sirisena. Janaka was a distinguished student of  Nalanda College Colombo and he held numerous leadership positions during his high school time.

Janaka graduated with a Bachelor of Science (Honors) degree in Quantity Surveying in 1992 (having spent 2 extra years due to civil unrest) from the University of Moratuwa, Sri Lanka. He was the "Batch Top" (top student of the year) for all four consecutive years and obtained two convocation awards in 1992 – the Professor H.P.S. Caldera Memorial Award for best final year student, and the Institute of Quantity Surveyors Award for the best graduate of the program  Ruwanpura was a lecturer in Quantity Surveying at the University of Moratuwa from 1992 to 1995. He was also an active quantity surveying consultant for a number of clients and companies in Sri Lanka and served as the founding Manager – Projects for QServe, a Quantity Surveying firm in Sri Lanka.

In 1994, Janaka received both the U.S. Fulbright Scholarship and President's Scholarship of Sri Lanka  In 1995, he chose the US Fulbright to pursue a Master of Science in Construction Management at Arizona State University and graduated in 1997. Janaka chose the University of Alberta in Edmonton, Canada for his PhD to work with one of the world's top professors in construction engineering and management – Professor Simaan AbouRizk. Janaka had received a F.S. Chia PhD scholarship and obtained a PhD in Construction Engineering and management in 2001. He was a star student winning 7 awards and scholarships during his PhD studies.

Career

In 2001, he was recruited by the University of Calgary (UCalgary) as an Assistant professor in Civil Engineering specializing in project management. He was promoted as an Associate Professor with tenure in 2006. The current President of UCalgary, Dr. Elizabeth Cannon, then Dean of Engineering, nominated Janaka (to the Federal Government of Canada) as a Canada Research Chair in Project Management Systems in 2007, which was renewed in 2012 for another 5 years.

Janaka became a full professor in 2011. He was the Director of the Project Management Specialization since 2005 and became the founding director of the Centre for Project Management Excellence in the Schulich School of Engineering in 2011.

In 2013 he was appointed as the Vice-Provost International (equivalent to Pro-Vice-Chancellor International) of the University of Calgary for a 5-year term. The UCalgary had a comprehensive international search and found Janaka as the successful candidate to lead UCalgary's international strategy. Janaka resigned from the Canada Research Chair to accept this senior leadership position. The University of Calgary re-appointed him for the second term of 5 years as Vice-Provost International for until June 2023. The University of Calgary extended his responsibilities in 2020 by appointing him for a dual role - both the Vice-Provost and Associate Vice-President Research (International)

Janaka is a dual professional in Canada – he is a licensed professional engineer (P.Eng) in Alberta and a professional quantity surveyor (PQS) in Canada. He is also a Professional/ Chartered Member of the Royal Institution of Chartered Surveyors, UK (MRICS) and Fellow of the Institute of Quantity Surveyors in Sri Lanka. In 2014, he was inducted as a fellow of the Canadian Society of Civil Engineering (FCSCE). In 2021, he was  inducted as a member of the National Academy of Construction in the United States.

Janaka was also a founding member and then the convenor of the International Institute for Infrastructure Resilience and Reconstruction, a multi-university international consortium which provides overall leadership in research, education, planning, design and implementation for mitigation of the impact of natural disasters and infrastructure renewal and reconstruction projects in tsunami affected or underdeveloped regions.

Janaka has been elected as the new executive chair of the Association of Public and Land-grant Universities (APLU) Commission on International Initiatives (CII) Executive Committee. Ruwanpura is the first Canadian member to chair  the executive committee of one of APLU’s commissions and councils. He is also a member of the Board for Canadian Bureau for International Education since Nov. 2020.

Scholarly accomplishments

Ruwnapura had very productive scholarly achievements during his short academic career. He had mentored and supervised over 150 graduate students. He also led the development of many best practices and tools in engineering and technology in the areas of Construction Engineering, Civil Engineering and Project management. He has been successful in establishing research in these areas, developing a novel research area under the themes of construction productivity improvement, modeling and simulation analysis with backing and funding from industry partners. He developed a "Productivity ToolBox" for ten strategic areas. Some of these tools such as i-Booth© are now commercialized. He has published over 180 technical articles in refereed journal papers and conference papers.  He had delivered 15 keynote speeches and over 200 presentations and workshops.

Honours and awards

Professor Ruwanpura has received many awards and honours.
 Received "Board of Directors Leadership Award" from the Canadian Bureau for International Education on Nov. 19, 2020 at the Virtual Excellence Awards Gala during CBIE’a annual conference 2020 .
 Received "International Achievement Award" at the City of Calgary Awards  on June 15, 2020. 
 Received the "Lifetime Achievement" Award from the Sri Lanka Foundation in Los Angeles on Nov. 20, 2016 
 Received the "Science, Technology, Engineering and Math" award at the 20th Distinction of Immigration Awards, Immigrant Services Calgary, March 2016.
 Received the Canadian Society for Civil Engineering’s Walter Shanly Career Award in 2012 for outstanding contributions to the development and practice of construction engineering in Canada. He has been the youngest academic to win this award.
 Recognized by the Association for the Advancement of Cost Engineering International (AACEI) with the prestigious Brian D. Dunfield Educational Service Award at the 2012 Annual Meeting held in San Antonio. This award is presented to recognize and honour the educational teaching achievements by an individual who is a member of the cost engineering community considering advancing the skills and knowledge of cost engineering through teaching, writing, editing, and/or publishing educational materials used to train and educate present and future cost professionals.  This is the very first time that a Canadian has been recognized with this honour. In the past, all the winners were from the United States.
 Received a rare honour with the "Industry Partnership Award" from the Calgary Construction Association for the research that he has developed for the construction industry. The award states, "In recognition of your vision, inspiration and leadership in building the framework for a collaborative approach for improving construction productivity through Research and Innovation. The new Productivity ToolBox has changed the culture of the Canadian Construction Industry and has positively impacted a more productive and efficient workforce which can compete in the global marketplace."
 Inducted as a fellow of the Canadian Society for Civil Engineering

Professor Ruwanpura with his two colleagues (Dr. Reza Maalek and Professor Derek Litchi representing the Automated Monitoring and Control Systems Group) won the "Outstanding Achievement in Applied Technology Innovation award" at the Alberta Science and Technology (ASTECH) awards in 2018.

In addition to the above international, national and local awards, he had received numerous awards from the University of Calgary.

 Research Achievement Award - Individual, Schulich School of Engineering, University of Calgary, 2017.
 Graduate Teaching Excellence Award – Instructor, Graduate Students’ Association, University of Calgary, 2008.
 Graduate Educator Award, Schulich School of Engineering, 2008. The criteria of the award considers many aspects including success at motivating and challenging students to reach their potential, enthusiasm, availability, ability to inspire, the extent of involvement in graduate academic and extra-curricular activities. 
 Distinguished Contribution as an Organization Award, Project Management Institute – Southern Alberta Chapter (Project Management Specialization won this award under his Directorship), June 2007.
 University of Calgary's Presidential Internalization Achievement Award for the most significant contribution as a faculty member, 2006 (Youngest to receive this award since award inception). 
 Service Excellence Award, Schulich School of Engineering, 2006.
 Co-instructor of a university programme ("Alta de Lisboa" project for Department of Civil Engineering), University of Calgary's Presidential International Achievement Award for best academic programme in 2004.

Vice-Provost International (VPI) role at the University of Calgary

As a VPI he leads the implementation of the international strategy aimed to position the University of Calgary as a global intellectual hub, advancing the university's efforts in areas such as international education and research partnerships and programming, staff and student mobility, on-campus internationalization and more. Since 2013, Ruwanpura's leadership as VPI had contributed to establish various new initiatives and projects (see below) at UCalgary and to win six excellence and innovation awards including the prestigious Institutional Award for Global Learning, Research, & Engagement from the Association of Public and Land Grant Universities Association for Public and Land-grant Universities in 2017  (first Canadian University to win this award), prestigious Board of Directors’ Award for Comprehensive Internationalization from the Canadian Bureau for International Education in 2016  during their 50th Anniversary and the bronze award for Excellence in Education from the Canada China Business Council. In 2019, Ruwanpura and his staff at the University of Calgary was recognized with  a Catalyst Award for Innovation by the  Canadian Bureau for International Education for developing an International Partnership Assessment Rating Index (IPARI) for  a method to assess international partnerships, identify top partners in each country, develop strategic partnerships and decide whether to re-engage or eliminate stalled partnerships. In February 2020, Association of International Education Administrators honored the University of Calgary with an Innovation Award  in Internationalization for IPARI..

 The University of Calgary launched many projects in China led or co-led by Professor Ruwanpura.
a) Science and engineering undergraduate students in China are able to start their studies at home and complete them in Calgary, thanks to a new program developed under the University of Calgary's international strategy. The program will appeal to foreign students wishing to enhance their English language skills, work internationally or join a top company in their home country after graduation. Participants study in Canada and earn a second degree – in addition to one from their university in China – that will expand their post-graduation options. 
	
b) The University of Calgary established a new Global Research Site in Energy – 4000 square meters of new space with 7 research labs and training room with a donation from a Chinese company (worth $11.5 Million).

 The University of Calgary and the Mexican Ministry of Energy (SENER) recently signed a collaboration note that opens up a long-term partnership to help Mexico boost its energy sector. As part of this partnership, SENER has allocated 150 million pesos (about $11.5 Million) over four years from their hydrocarbon fund for Mexican organizations that want to collaborate with the university on energy research and education. In Aug. 2016, UCalgary  celebrated the opening of its first office at Universidad Nacional Autónoma de México (UNAM) in Mexico City. However, the University of Calgary researchers managed to secure funding beyond 11.5 million by securing funding for 649 Million pesos (about $44 Million) in March 2017 under four knowledge areas collaborating with Mexican organizations 
 The University of Calgary announced new funding and expanded opportunities for over $1 Million through an initiative of Prof. Ruwanpura to encourage international study, research, and training for students, faculty, and administrative staff.

Professional activities

Because of the development of many innovative tools and processes related to Risk and Project Management, he had provided his consulting, professional and training services as President of JYR Consultants to Canadian companies, associations and organizations and in many international countries.

Personal life

Janaka lives with his wife Senani and their only son Seniru in Calgary. Because of his passion for music, he was chosen as the special guest to appear live on a popular musical program called Sihinayaki Re telecast by the Sri Lanka Rupavahini Corporation.

References

General references 

 

 

 

Sri Lankan Buddhists
Sinhalese academics
Alumni of Nalanda College, Colombo
Canadian people of Sri Lankan descent
Sri Lankan expatriate academics